Akah may refer to:

Long Akah, settlement in Malaysia
Emmanuel Akah (born 1979), English-American footballer
Aga Khan Academy, Hyderabad, a full International Baccalaureate school in Hyderabad
Aga Khan Agency for Habitat, umbrella of AKDN agencies and programs that provides aid and delivers training on habitat and disaster preparedness